Soon Over Babaluma is the fifth studio album by the rock music group Can. This is the band's first album following the departure of Damo Suzuki in 1973. The vocals are provided by guitarist Michael Karoli and keyboardist Irmin Schmidt. It is also their last album that was created using a two-track tape recorder.

It takes the ambient style of Future Days and pushes it even further at times, as on "Quantum Physics", although there are also some upbeat tracks, such as "Chain Reaction" and "Dizzy Dizzy".

Reception

American musician Dominique Leone reviewed Soon Over Babaluma for Pitchfork, writing that he "was constantly surprised at how clear everything sounded, as if the band had recorded all of this stuff in one fell swoop during an unbelievably inspired, marathon session. One of the great things about Can ... was the attention to detail and realization that the effect of each tiny moment in the course of a song can affect the momentum of the entire piece. No small miracles here: even if it's sad to think these albums represent Can's last great gasp, none of their moments have ever sounded better".  In his review for Allmusic, American music journalist Ned Raggett stated that "With Suzuki departed, vocal responsibilities were now split between Karoli and Schmidt. Wisely, neither try to clone Mooney or Suzuki, instead aiming for their own low-key way around things", giving the album a rating of four stars out of five. Robert Christgau was less impressed in The Village Voice, comparing its "singularly European" music to a less interesting, less biting variation on Miles Davis' 1970s electric period: "It's never pompous, discernibly smart, playful, even goofy. If you give it your all you can make out a few shards of internal logic. But the light tone avoids texture, density, or pain. The jazzy pulse is innocent of swing, funk, or sex". In The Rolling Stone Album Guide, Douglas Wolk said the album was "mellow and almost timid in places", with the exception of "Chain Reaction", deeming the song a precursor to 1990s techno.

Track listing
All lyrics written by Holger Czukay, Michael Karoli, Jaki Liebezeit, and Irmin Schmidt, unless otherwise noted.

Personnel 
 Can
 Michael Karoli – vocals (1, 4, 5), violin (1), guitar (all tracks), electric violin (2, 3), backing vocals (2)
 Irmin Schmidt – organ (all tracks), electric piano (1, 3, 4, 5), Alpha 77 (all tracks), piano (1, 3, 4, 5), electronic percussion (2)
 Jaki Liebezeit – percussion (all tracks)
 Holger Czukay – bass (all tracks)

 Production
Can – producers
Holger Czukay – chief engineer and editing
Ulli Eichberger – artwork and design
Andreas Torkler – 2005 remastering

Release history
The album was first released in LP format throughout Europe in 1974 via United Artists Records, with the exclusion of Spain where it was released on Ariola Eurodisc. It was published in the U.S. the following year through United Artists. In 1989, it was first released in CD format in Europe and the U.S. on Spoon Records and Mute Records. In 2005, the album was remastered and first published in Super Audio CD format.

See the table below for a more comprehensive list of the album releases.

References 

1974 albums
Can (band) albums
Mute Records albums
United Artists Records albums